Košarkaški klub Tamiš, commonly referred to as KK Tamiš, is a men's professional basketball club based in Pančevo, Serbia. They are currently competing in the Basketball League of Serbia.

History
The club was founded in 1992 under the name KK Agropan. In 2000, the club changed its name to KK Tamiš. They made their Basketball League of Serbia debut in the 2008–09 season.

Sponsorship naming
The club has had several denominations through the years due to its sponsorship:

Home arena 

Tamiš plays their home games at the Strelište Sports Hall. It has a seating capacity of 1,100.

Players

Current roster

Coaches 

 Nebojša Vidić (2003–2005)
 Oliver Popović (2005–2006)
 Aleksandar Bućan (2006)
 Vojkan Benčić (2006–2007)
 Dragan Nikolić (2007–2009)
 Bojan Jovičić (2009–2021)
 Nebojša Vidić (2021)
 Bojan Jovičić (2021–present)

Trophies and awards

Trophies
Second League of Serbia (2nd-tier)
Winner (1): 2007–08

Notable players
  Nenad Čanak

See also 
 KK Profikolor
 KK Dinamo Pančevo

External links
 Official website
 KK Tamiš at srbijasport.net
 KK Tamiš at eurobasket.com

Tamis
Basketball teams established in 1992
Pančevo
1992 establishments in Serbia